Acorn Theater may refer to:

 Acorn Theater, Three Oaks, Michigan, created by Kim Clark (candidate)
 Acorn Theatre, on Theatre Row in New York City